Qantas Awards can refer to:

Qantas Television Awards
Qantas Media Award